Lumineta Hertea is a Romanian sprint canoer who competed in the late 1980s. She won a silver medal in the K-2 5000 m event at the 1989 ICF Canoe Sprint World Championships in Plovdiv.

References

Living people
Romanian female canoeists
Year of birth missing (living people)
ICF Canoe Sprint World Championships medalists in kayak